Kushan art, the art of the Kushan Empire in northern India, flourished between the 1st and the 4th century CE. It blended the traditions of the Greco-Buddhist art of Gandhara, influenced by Hellenistic artistic canons, and the more Indian art of Mathura. Kushan art follows the Hellenistic art of the Greco-Bactrian Kingdom as well as Indo-Greek art which had been flourishing between the 3rd century BCE and 1st century CE in Bactria and northwestern India, and the succeeding Indo-Scythian art. Before invading northern and central India and establishing themselves as a full-fledged empire, the Kushans had migrated from northwestern China and occupied for more than a century these Central Asian lands, where they are thought to have assimilated remnants of Greek populations, Greek culture and Greek art, as well as the languages and scripts which they used in their coins and inscriptions: Greek and Bactrian, which they used together with the Indian Brahmi script.

With the demise of the Kushans in the 4th century CE, the Indian Gupta Empire prevailed, and Gupta art developed. The Gupta Empire incorporated vast portions of central, northern and northwestern India, as far as the Punjab and the Arabian sea, continuing and expanding on the earlier artistic tradition of the Kushans and developing a unique Gupta style.

Dynastic art of the Kushans
Some traces remain of the presence of the Kushans in the areas of Bactria and Sogdiana. Archaeological structures are known in Takht-I-Sangin, Surkh Kotal (a monumental temple), and in the palace of Khalchayan. Various sculptures and friezes are known, representing horse-riding archers, and, significantly, men with artificially deformed skulls, such as the Kushan prince of Khalchayan (a practice well attested in nomadic Central Asia).

Khalchayan (1st century BCE)

The art of Khalchayan of the end of the 2nd-1st century BCE is probably one of the first known manifestations of Kushan art. It is ultimately derived from Hellenistic art, and possibly from the art of the cities of Ai-Khanoum and Nysa. At Khalchayan, rows of in-the-round terracotta statues showed Kushan princes in dignified attitudes, while some of the sculptural scenes are thought to depict the Kushans fighting against the Sakas. The Yuezis are shown with a majestic demeanour, whereas the Sakas are typically represented with side-wiskers, displaying expressive and sometimes grotesque features.

According to Benjamin Rowland, the styles and ethnic type visible in Kalchayan already anticipate the characteristics of the later Art of Gandhara and may even have been at the origin of its development. Rowland particularly draws attention to the similarity of the ethnic types represented at Khalchayan and in the art of Gandhara, and also in the style of portraiture itself. For example, Rowland find a great proximity between the famous head of a Yuezhi prince from Khalchayan, and the head of Gandharan Bodhisattvas, giving the example of the Gandharan head of a Bodhisattva in the Philadelphia Museum of Art. The similarity of the Gandhara Bodhisattva with the portrait of the Kushan ruler Heraios is also striking. According to Rowland the Bactrian art of Khalchayan thus survived for several centuries through its influence in the art of Gandhara, thanks to the patronage of the Kushans.

Bactria and India (1st-2nd century CE)
The Kushans apparently favoured royal portraiture, as can be seen in their coins and their dynastic sculptures. A monumental sculpture of King Kanishka I has been found in Mathura in northern India, which is characterized by its frontality and martial stance, as he holds firmly his sword and a mace. His heavy coat and riding boots are typically nomadic Central Asian, and are way too heavy for the warm climate of India. His coat is decorated by hundreds of pearls, which probably symbolize his wealth. His grandiose regnal title is inscribed in the Brahmi script: "The Great King, King of Kings, Son of God, Kanishka".

As the Kushans progressively adapted to life in India, their dress progressively became lighter, and representation less frontal and more natural, although they retained characteristic elements of their nomadic dress, such as the trousers and boots, the heavy tunics, and heavy belts.

Art of Gandhara under the Kushans

Kushan art blended the traditions of the Greco-Buddhist art of Gandhara, influenced by Hellenistic artistic canons, and the more Indian art of Mathura. Most of the Greco-Buddhist art of Gandhara is thought to have been produced by the Kushans, starting from the end of the 1st century CE.

The Kushans were eclectic in their religions, venerating tens of Gods from Iranian, Greek or Indian traditions as can be seen on their coins. It is thought that this tolerant religious climate, together with an openness towards visual arts encouraged the creation of innovative figural art in the Jain, Buddhist and Brahmanic traditions. The Buddha was only represented with symbols in earlier Indian art as in Sanchi or Bharhut. The first known representations of the Buddha seem to appear before the arrival of the Kushans, as shown with the Bimaran casket, but Buddhist art undoubtedly flourished under their rule, and most of the known early statues of the Buddha are dated to the period of the Kushans.

The characteristics of early Kushan art in depicting the Buddha can be ascertained through the study of several statues bearing dated inscriptions. Some statues of the standing Buddha with inscriptions dating them to 143 CE, such as the Loriyan Tangai buddha, show that the features of that time are already rather late and somewhat degenerate compared to more classical types: the figure of the Buddha is comparatively more stout, shorter and broader, the drapery is already not as three-dimensional, and the head is large and broad-jawed.

Numerous Kushan devotees, with their characteristic Central Asia costume, can be seen on the Buddhist statuary of Gandhara and Mathura:

Art of Mathura under the Kushans

From the time of Vima Kadphises or Kanishka I the Kushans established one of their capitals at Mathura in northern India. Mathura already had an important artistic tradition by that time, but the Kushan greatly developed its production, especially through Buddhist art. A few sculptures of the Buddha, such as the "Isapur Buddha" are known from Mathura from circa 15 CE, well before the arrival of the Kushans, at a time when the Northern Satrap Sodasa still ruled in Mathura, but the style and symbolism of these early depictions was still tentative. The Kushans standardized the symbolism of these early Buddha statues, developing their attributes and aesthetic qualities in an exuberant manner and on an unprecedented large scale.

Bodhisattvas
The style of the statues of Bodhisattvas at Mathura is somewhat reminiscent of the earlier monumental Yaksha statues, usually dated to one or two centuries earlier. The Greco-Buddhist art of Gandhara, although belonging to the same realm under the Kushans, seems to have had only limited influence on these creations. Some authors consider that Hellenistic influence appears in the liveliness and the realistic details of the figures (an evolution compared to the stiffness of Mauryan art), the use of perspective from 150 BCE, iconographical details such as the knot and the club of Heracles, the wavy folds of the dresses, or the depiction of bacchanalian scenes. The art of Mathura became extremely influential over the rest of India, and was "the most prominent artistic production center from the second century BCE".

Standing Buddhas

The Mathura standing Buddha seems to be a slightly later development compared to the Bodhisattvas of the type of the Bala Bodhisattva. Although several are dated to the 2nd century CE, they often tend to display characteristics that would become the hallmark of Gupta art, especially the very thin dress seemingly sticking to the body of the Buddha. These statues of the standing Buddha however tend to display characteristic and attitudes more readily seen in the Greco-Buddhist art of Gandhara: the head of the Buddha is surrounded by a halo, the clothing covers both shoulders, the left hand hold the gown of the Buddha while the other hand form an Abbhiya mudra, and the folds in the clothing are more typical of the Gandharan styles.

In many respect, the standing Buddha of Mathura seems to be a combination of the local sculptural tradition initiated by the Yakshas with the Hellenistic designs of the Buddhas from the Greco-Buddhist art of Gandhara.

Other sculptural works
The Mathura sculptures incorporate many Hellenistic elements, such as the general idealistic realism, and key design elements such as the curly hair, and folded garment. Specific Mathuran adaptations tend to reflect warmer climatic conditions, as they consist in a higher fluidity of the clothing, which progressively tend to cover only one shoulder instead of both. Also, facial types also tend to become more Indianized. Banerjee in Hellenism in ancient India describes "the mixed character of the Mathura School in which we find on the one hand, a direct continuation of the old Indian art of Barhut and Sanchi and on the other hand, the classical influence derived from Gandhara".

In some cases however, a clear influence from the art of Gandhara can also be felt, as in the case of the "Mathura Herakles", a Hellenistic statue of Herakles strangling the Nemean lion, discovered in Mathura, and now in the Kolkota Indian Museum, as well as Bacchanalian scenes. Although inspired from the art of Gandhara, the portraiture of Herakles is not perfectly exact and may show a lack of understanding of the subject matter, as Herakles is shown already wearing the skin of the lion he is fighting.

Hindu art at Mathura under the Kushans

Hindu art started to develop fully from the 1st to the 2nd century CE, and there are only very few examples of artistic representation before that time. Almost all of the first known instances of Hindu art have been discovered in the areas of Mathura and Gandhara. Hindu art found its first inspiration in the Buddhist art of Mathura. The three Vedic gods Indra, Brahma and Surya were actually first depicted in Buddhist sculpture from the 2nd-1st century BCE, as attendants in scenes commemorating the life of the Buddha, even when the Buddha himself was not yet shown in human form but only through his symbols, such as the scenes of his Birth, his Descent from the Trāyastriṃśa Heaven, or his retreat in the Indrasala Cave. During the time of the Kushans, Hindu art progressively incorporated a profusion of original Hindu stylistic and symbolic elements, in contrast with the general balance and simplicity of Buddhist art. The differences appear in iconography rather than in style. It is generally considered that it is in Mathura, during the time of the Kushans, that the Brahmanical deities were given their standard form:

Cult images of Vāsudeva

Cult images of Vāsudeva continued to be produced during the period, the worship of this Mathuran deity being much more important than that of Vishnu until the 4th century CE. Statues dating to the 2nd and 3rd century show a possibly four-armed Vāsudeva standing with his attributes: the wheel, the mace and the conch, his right hand saluting in Abhaya mudra. Only with the Gupta period, did statues focusing on the worship of Vishnu himself start to appear, using the same iconography as the statues of Vāsudeva, but with the addition of an aureole starting at the shoulders. During this time, statues pertaining to Gopala-Krishna, the other main component of the amalgamated Krishna, are absent from Mathura, suggesting the near absence of this cult in northern India down to the end of the Gupta period (6th century CE).

Some sculptures during this period suggest that the "Vyūha doctrine" (Vyūhavāda, "Doctrine of the emanations") was starting to emerge, as images of "Chatur-vyūha" (the "four emanations of Vāsudeva") are appearing. The famous "Caturvyūha" statue in Mathura Museum is an attempt to show in one composition Vāsudeva as the central deity together with the other members of the Vrishni clan of the Pancharatra system emanating from him: Samkarsana, Pradyumna and Aniruddha, with Samba missing. The back of the relief is carved with the branches of a Kadamba tree, symbolically showing the genealogical relationship being the different deities. The depiction of Vāsudeva and later Vishnu was stylistically derived from the type of the ornate Bodhisattvas, with rich jewelry and ornate headdress.

Jain art
Various dedications in the name of Kushan kings, such as Vasudeva I, with dates, appear on fragments of Jain statuary discovered in Mathura.

Chronology

The chronology of Kushan art is quite critical to the art history of the region. Fortunately, several statues are dated and have inscriptions referring to the various rulers of the Kushan Empire.

Coinage is also very important in determining the evolution of style, as in the case of the famous "Buddha" coins of Kanishka I, which are dated to his reign (c. 127–150 CE) and already displays an accomplished form of the standing Buddha, probably derived from pre-existing statuary.

While the early styles of Kushan statues seem comparatively crude, later, highly ornamented statues are generally dated to the 3rd-4th century CE.

The Brussels Buddha is one of the rare Gandharan statues with a dated inscription, and it bears the date "Year 5", possibly referring to the Kanishka era, hence 132 CE. However, its sophisticated style has led some authors to suggest a later era for the calculation of the date.

Kushan coinage

The coinage of the Kushans was abundant and an important tool of propaganda in promoting each Kushan ruler. One of the names for Kushan coins was Dinara, which ultimately came from the Roman name Denarius aureus. The coinage of the Kushans was copied as far as the Kushano-Sasanians in the west, and the kingdom of Samatata in Bengal to the east. The coinage of the Gupta Empire was also initially derived from the coinage of the Kushan Empire, adopting its weight standard, techniques and designs, following the conquests of Samudragupta in the northwest. The imagery on Gupta coins then became more Indian in both style and subject matter compared to earlier dynasties, where Greco-Roman and Persian styles were mostly followed.

Influence of the Parthian cultural sphere

According to John M. Rosenfield, the statuary of the Kushans has strong similarities with the art of the Parthian cultural area. Similarities are numerous in terms of clothing, decorative elements or posture, which tend to be massive and frontal, with feet often splayed. In particular, the statuary of Hatra, which has remained in a relative good state of preservation, shows such similarities. This could be due either to direct cultural exchanges between the area of Mesopotamia and the Kushan Empire at that time, or from a common Parthian artistic background leading to similar types of representation.

See also

 Indo-Scythians
 Greco-Buddhist art
 Gupta art

References

Indian art
Buddhist art
Ancient Central Asian art